Camilo Miettinen (born March 1, 1986) is a Colombian-born Finnish professional ice hockey forward. He is currently played for HC TPS of the Finnish Liiga.

Miettinen made his SM-liiga debut playing with Espoo Blues during the 2006–07 season. In 2014 he signed a one-year contract with Swedish team IK Oskarshamn playing in HockeyAllsvenskan.

Early life
Miettinen was adopted from Colombia to Finland when he was two years old.

References

External links

1986 births
Living people
Colombian ice hockey players
Espoo Blues players
IK Oskarshamn players
Finnish ice hockey forwards
Finnish people of Colombian descent
Sportspeople from Medellín
HC TPS players
Colombian emigrants
Finnish adoptees
People with acquired Finnish citizenship